Barbara Stewart may refer to:

 Barbara Stewart (composer) (1941–2011), American composer and musician
 Barbara Stewart (politician) (born 1952), New Zealand politician